The Harita Group is an Indonesian business conglomerate owned and controlled by the Lim family. The group's core businesses are in the natural resources sector, which operates throughout Indonesia. Today, the Harita Group has businesses in nickel mining, ferronickel smelters, bauxite mining, alumina refineries, palm oil plantations, shipping, timber, coal and property. After the 2014 government regulations to ban exports of raw minerals, Harita Group and its partners built a $400 million ferronickel smelter and Indonesia's first alumina refinery for $900 million, both of which have been completed and in full operation since 2016. In December 2019, Glencore International became a partner of Harita Group via its share sale and rights issue of Indonesian-listed Cita Mineral. In June 2021, Harita commissioned the first HPAL plant in Indonesia, which produces Mixed Hydroxide Precipitate, a raw material for electric vehicle batteries. The project had an estimated cost of $1 billion. The current CEO of Harita Group is Lim Gunawan Hariyanto.

History
The group was started in 1915 by Lim Tju King, an immigrant from China. He started with a small trading shop in Long Iram inland of Mahakam river in East Kalimantan, Indonesia. His son Lim Hariyanto Wijaya Sarwono took over and moved into the timber business, first by trading timber logs and later on timber concessions and in manufacturing of plywood in 1983.

Starting in the late 1980s, Lim Hariyanto started rapidly expanding the business through joint venture partnerships. They expanded their timber and plywood division, entered into gold mining in 1988 through a joint venture project with Rio Tinto Group named Kelian Equatorial Mining (KEM) and later into coal mining in 1988.   From there, the group continued to diversify into palm oil plantations (1998), bauxite mining (2003), and nickel mining (2004). In 2013, the Group embarked on alumina refinery project and 2015 in ferro nickel project. As of September 2016, both projects have been completed and are in full operation.

Businesses
Palm oil division: In April 2012, the Harita Group listed its palm oil division, Bumitama Agri, on the Singapore Exchange. Since then, the company has won numerous awards, including Forbes' Best Under A Billion award, Asiamoney's Best Corporate Governance Award, Best Corporate Social Responsibility Award, Best For Disclosure and Transparency Award, Most Outstanding Company in Singapore and Best Investor Relations Award.

Bauxite division: Harita Group mines and sells bauxite ore. Additionally, the group has invested US$930 million to build an alumina refinery in West Kalimantan, which processes bauxite ore into alumina. This refinery produces 1 million tons of alumina per year and is currently in full operation. Glencore International is a shareholder in Harita's Bauxite Division in PT Cita Mineral Investindo Tbk.

Nickel division: The group also mines and sells nickel ore. In June 2015, Harita Group announced its investment of US$380 million to build a nickel smelter and a 120-megawatt power plant in North Maluku. The smelter will process nickel ore and will be able to produce 220,000 tons of ferronickel metal per year. In June 2021, Harita commissioned their $1 billion HPAL refinery which is the first in Indonesia. It produces mixed hydroxide precipitate, which is the raw material used in making electric vehicle batteries.

Other businesses: Harita Group also has a coal division, which was set up in 1996 with Thai coal producer Lanna Resources Pcl to develop coal deposits in Indonesia. The group also owns Jakarta-listed PT Tirta Mahakam Resources, which makes plywood products. In 2018, the group also partnered with Singapore listed company Perennial Real Estate Holdings Ltd to develop a property project in Sentul City, Indonesia.

References

Conglomerate companies of Indonesia
Companies based in Jakarta
Conglomerate companies established in 1915
Non-renewable resource companies established in 1915
1915 establishments in the Dutch East Indies